Axel Allan Johansson (May 23, 1910 – May 20, 1983) was a Swedish speed skater who competed in the Olympic games in 1936 in Garmisch-Partenkirchen.

In 1936 he finished 18th in the 500 metres competition, 22nd in the 10000 metres event, 26th  in the 5000 metres competition, and 29th in the 1500 metres event.

References

1910 births
1983 deaths
Swedish male speed skaters
Olympic speed skaters of Sweden
Speed skaters at the 1936 Winter Olympics
20th-century Swedish people